Mark Hubbard may refer to:
 Mark Hubbard (musician), American gospel musician
 Mark "Monk" Hubbard (1970–2018), American skateboarder
 Mark Hubbard (golfer) (born 1989), American golfer